The John Barnd House is a historic house in Kearney, Nebraska. It was built in 1892 for John Barnd, a veteran of the Union Army during the Civil War of 1861-1865 who founded the Mutual Loan and Investment Company of Kearney and was the co-owner of the Commercial and Savings Bank of Kearney. The house was designed in the Queen Anne architectural style. It has been listed on the National Register of Historic Places since March 31, 1983.

References

National Register of Historic Places in Buffalo County, Nebraska
Queen Anne architecture in Nebraska
Houses completed in 1892